Kakora  is a village in Budaun Tehsil and Budaun district, Uttar Pradesh, India. Its village code is 128608. The village is administrated by Gram Panchayat.

Kakora is also known for Mela Kakora Ganga Snan at the river of Ganga.

References

Villages in Budaun district